The French Navy is actively planning for a future aircraft carrier and new flagship. It is known in French as Porte-avions de nouvelle génération (PA-NG) for 'new generation aircraft carrier'. Construction of the PANG is expected to begin around 2025 and it will enter service in 2038; the year the aircraft carrier  is due to be retired. The ship will be nuclear-powered and feature the Electromagnetic Aircraft Launch System (EMALS) catapult system.

History

Context 
The current French aircraft carrier, the nuclear-powered Charles de Gaulle  entered service on 18 May 2001. As the only aircraft carrier of the French Navy, the ship's maintenance periods leave France without an available aircraft carrier.  As a result the PA2 project (French: Porte-Avions 2, "Aircraft Carrier 2") started in 2003 to study the feasibility of another carrier based on the design of the British Queen Elizabeth-class. The PA2 project was suspended in 2009 and ultimately cancelled in 2013.

In October 2018, French Minister of the Armed Forces Florence Parly announced the start of a second carrier programme, this time as replacement for Charles de Gaulle. The military planning legislation for 2019-2025 (Loi de programmation militaire 2019-2025) defined a 18-month, €40M study phase, to allow the President to decide on the main characteristics of the programme by 2020. In May 2020, during a visit to Chantiers de l'Atlantique, Parly stated that the new carrier would be built in Saint-Nazaire — as expected, since it is the only dry dock in France capable of harbouring ships of that size.

Architecture, propulsion options and number of ships were originally to be decided by President Macron in July 2020, to allow him to make the announcement at Bastille Day. However, on 6 July 2020, a governmental reshuffle put the Castex government in charge, forcing to delay the Defence Council to later in the year.

During a visit to the Framatome site at Le Creusot on 8 December 2020, President Macron officially announced the start of the PANG programme, and selection of nuclear propulsion for the new ship.

Construction 
In May 2020, Defence minister Florence Parly stated that the PANG would be built in Saint-Nazaire at Chantiers de l'Atlantique.

See also 
 French aircraft carrier PA2 (previous effort to construct a new French aircraft carrier, canceled 2013)
 Future of the French Navy

References

Aircraft carriers of the French Navy
Proposed aircraft carriers
Nuclear-powered ships